Chorus Viennensis is a male choir associated with the Vienna Boys Choir. It was founded in 1952. The choir has won the Grand Prix du Disque, the  Mozart Interpretation Prize and the Schubert Interpretation prize.

References

1952 establishments in Austria
Austrian choirs